Felipe Andres Coronel (born February 19, 1978), better known by the stage name Immortal Technique, is an American rapper. Most of his lyrics focus on controversial issues in global politics, from a radical left-wing perspective.

Immortal Technique seeks to retain control over his production, and has stated in his music that record companies, not artists themselves, profit the most from mass production and marketing of music. He claimed in an interview to have sold close to a combined total of 200,000 copies of his first three official releases.

Early life 
Coronel was born in a military hospital in Lima. He is of mostly Amerindian descent, and also has Spanish, French and African ancestry. His family immigrated to Harlem, New York, in 1980 to escape the Peruvian Civil War. During his teenage years, he was arrested multiple times due in part to what he has said was "selfish and childish" behavior. He attended Hunter College High School on the Upper East Side of Manhattan, where his classmates included Chris Hayes and Lin-Manuel Miranda, whom he bullied, although the two later became friends. Shortly after enrolling in Pennsylvania State University, he was arrested and charged with assault-related offenses due to his involvement in an altercation between fellow students; the charges stemming from this incident led to him being incarcerated for a year.

After being paroled, he took political science classes at Baruch College in New York City for two semesters at the behest of his father, who allowed Coronel to live with him on the condition that he went to school. Honing his rapping skills in jail, and unable to find decent wage-paying employment after his release, he began selling his music on the streets of New York and battling with other MCs. This, coupled with his victories in numerous freestyle rap competitions of the New York underground hip hop scene such as Rocksteady Anniversary and Braggin Rites, led to his reputation as a ferocious Battle MC.

Musical career

2000–2005: Revolutionary Vol. 1 and Revolutionary Vol. 2 

In 2001, Immortal Technique released his first album Revolutionary Vol. 1 without the help of a record label or distribution, instead using money earned from his rap battle triumphs. He also battled but lost to Posta Boy in 106 & Park's Freestyle Friday. Revolutionary Vol. 1 also contained the underground classic "Dance With The Devil". In November 2002, he was listed by The Source in its "Unsigned Hype" column, highlighting artists that are not signed to a record label. The following year, in September 2003, he received the coveted "Hip Hop Quotable" in The Source for a song entitled "Industrial Revolution" from his second album. Immortal Technique is the only rapper in history to have a "Hip Hop Quotable" while being unsigned. He released his second album Revolutionary Vol. 2 in 2003, which featured an intro and a spoken-word piece by death row inmate Mumia Abu-Jamal. In 2004 and 2005, Viper Records and Babygrande Records, respectively, re-released Immortal Technique's debut, Revolutionary Vol. 1, to make it available to a wider audience. "Point of No Return" from Revolutionary Vol 2 was used as the entrance theme for Rashad Evans during the UFC 88 Main Event between Chuck Liddell and Rashad Evans.

2005–present: The 3rd World, The Martyr and The Middle Passage 

Between 2005 and 2007 Immortal Technique began working on The Middle Passage and The 3rd World, the two albums that would serve a follow up to Revolutionary Vol. 2. The 3rd World, produced by DJ Green Lantern, was released in 2008. Emilee Woods, writing for RapReviews.com, reviewed the album positively, praising its "earnestly and skillfully delivered" material, and claiming that Technique had "finally found a comfort zone in the balance between lyricism and message."

He was also featured on several movie soundtracks and video game soundtracks, all the while touring relentlessly. In October 2011, Immortal Technique released The Martyr, a free compilation album of previously unreleased material and new tracks.

In an interview in 2020 with Latino USA, Immortal Technique discussed that he was working on writing a book. He also mentioned that he was in the process of creating a new album, but had faced setbacks because of the Covid-19 Pandemic.

Collaborations 

The summer of 2005 saw the release of "Bin Laden", a vinyl single 12" featuring Mos Def and DJ Green Lantern. The single also contained a remix of the song featured Chuck D of Public Enemy and KRS-One. In early 2006, the song "Impeach the President", featuring Dead Prez and Saigon turned up in the mixtape "Alive on Arrival" DJ Green Lantern. This is a simple version of The Honeydrippers, 1973, in which Immortal Technique urged fans to organize a vote of censure against George W. Bush. In April 2009, a new song leaked on the internet named "Democratie Fasciste (Article 4)" by Brazilian-French rapper Rockin' Squat which featured Immortal Technique. The official release of the song and Rockin' Squat's album Confessions D'un Enfant Du Siècle Volume 2 was on May 12, 2009. The instrumental from the song was sampled from Wendy Rene's "After Laughter". The song expresses the inequalities of the Third World and revolutionary events throughout history against tyranny and oppression.

The song contains lyrics in English (Immortal Technique), French (Rockin' Squat) and brief shout outs in Spanish (Immortal Technique). This song is Immortal Technique's first official international collaboration.  In early 2009, it was announced that there would be a collaboration between Technique and UK underground artist Lowkey, on a single called "Voices of the Voiceless". On September 11, 2009, a "snippet" of the song was released on YouTube.  The preview was released ahead of its September 21 launch on iTunes, as part of a web-campaign that included updates, promotion and links on forums, E-Magazines and several social networking sites. The song's lyrics cover a broad range of issues that are familiar to listeners of both artists – racism, world revolution, war, socialism, government control, rape, famine, colonialism, Classism, self-determination and the war in Iraq.

Activism 

Immortal Technique visits prisons to speak to youth and working with immigrant rights activists, and raising money for children's hospitals overseas. He created a writing grant program for high-school students as well.

In June 2008, Immortal Technique partnered with Omeid International, a non-profit human rights organization, and dubbed the work as "The Green Light Project". With the profits of the album The 3rd World, he traveled to Kabul, Afghanistan to help Omeid build an orphanage, the Amin Institute, without corporate or external funding.

Other work

Films 
Immortal Technique featured in Ice-T's documentary Something from Nothing: The Art of Rap.

The (R)evolution of Immortal Technique 
A documentary about Immortal Technique was released in September 2011 and premiered at the Harlem Film Festival. It was released on DVD on July 10, 2012.

This Revolution 

Immortal Technique appeared as himself in a docudrama film entitled This Revolution, which was recorded during the 2004 Republican National Convention in New York. The tape contains the protests surrounding the convention in the form of a documentary. It also featured Viper Records affiliates Akir and producer SouthPaw in roles.

Since then, Immortal Technique has taken control of Viper Records and has signed a distribution deal with Babygrande Records / E1 Entertainment to vent to their next album. SouthPaw has managed to establish himself as A&R of Viper Records.

Discography

Studio albums

Compilation album

Singles

References

External links 

21st-century American rappers
Hardcore hip hop artists
Underground rappers
Hispanic and Latino American rappers
Rappers from Manhattan
Hip hop activists
Political music artists
American music industry executives
American socialists
Baruch College alumni
Pennsylvania State University alumni
American people convicted of assault
People from Harlem
American people of indigenous peoples descent
American people of Peruvian descent
People from Lima
Peruvian exiles
1978 births
Living people
Hunter College High School alumni